Manolis Chiotis (Greek: Μανώλης Χιώτης; March 21, 1921 – March 20, 1970) was a Greek rebetiko and laiko composer, singer, and bouzouki player. He is considered one of the greatest bouzouki soloists of all time. He popularised the four-course bouzouki (tetrachordo) and introduced the guitar-like tuning, who found it better suited to the kind of virtuoso playing he was famous for.

Chiotis had other successes. In the summer of 1961, he played for Aristotle Onassis and Maria Callas, Prince Rainier III of Monaco and Grace Kelly. Journalist Dimitris Liberopoulos, Onassis’ biographer, writes in his book  that when the two couples joined one of Chiotis’ shows in Athens, they asked to meet him in person to congratulate him.

Callas told Chiotis that she had been translating the lyrics of his songs to Princess Grace all night long and the American actress loved them because “she is a woman in love.” At that moment, Kelly asked Chiotis what the difference between a bouzouki and an electric guitar is.

Chiotis’ answer was rather unexpected; “Mrs. Callas, please explain to Princess Grace that the strings of an electric guitar vibrate due to electricity, while the strings of a bouzouki vibrate through the heart.”

References

See also 
 Bouzouki
 Rebetes
 Rebetiko
 Laiko
 Greek nightclubs
 Greek music

1921 births
1970 deaths
Greek Macedonians
Musicians from Thessaloniki
Greek songwriters
Rebetiko musicians
Greek bouzouki players
Greek rebetiko singers
20th-century Greek male singers